This is a timeline of Uber, which offers a variety of transportation and logistics services and is an early example of the rise of the sharing economy.

Full timeline

See also
 Timeline of Lyft

References 

Uber